This is a list of Sites of Community Importance in Spain.

 List of Sites of Community Importance in Andalusia
 List of Sites of Community Importance in Aragon
 List of Sites of Community Importance in Principality of Asturias
 List of Sites of Community Importance in the Balearic Islands
 List of Sites of Community Importance in Basque Country
 List of Sites of Community Importance in the Canary Islands
 List of Sites of Community Importance in Cantabria
 List of Sites of Community Importance in Castile-La Mancha
 List of Sites of Community Importance in Castile and León
 List of Sites of Community Importance in Catalonia
 List of Sites of Community Importance in Ceuta
 List of Sites of Community Importance in Extremadura
 List of Sites of Community Importance in Galicia
 List of Sites of Community Importance in La Rioja
 List of Sites of Community Importance in the Community of Madrid
 List of Sites of Community Importance in Melilla
 List of Sites of Community Importance in the Region of Murcia
 List of Sites of Community Importance in Navarre
 List of Sites of Community Importance in Valencian Community
 List of Sites of Community Importance in Spain designated by the Ministry of Agriculture, Food and Environment

See also 
 List of Sites of Community Importance by country

References 
 List of Sites of Community Importance for several Mediterranean countries

Sites of Community Importance
Natura 2000 in Spain